Līgatne Municipality is a former municipality in Vidzeme, Latvia. The municipality was formed in 2009 by merging Līgatne parish and Līgatne town, with the administrative centre being Līgatne.

On 1 July 2021, Līgatne Municipality ceased to exist and its territory was merged into Cēsis Municipality.

See also 
 Administrative divisions of Latvia

References 

 
Former municipalities of Latvia